Berit Mørdre-Lammedal (née Mørdre, 16 April 1940 – 23 August 2016) was a Norwegian cross-country skier. She competed at the 1968 and 1972 Olympics in the 5 km, 10 km and 3 × 5 km relay events and won a complete set of medals: a gold, a silver and a bronze. She also won a silver medal in the relay at the 1966 World Championships.

Mørdre was born and raised on a farm in Nes, but since 1965 lived in Oslo, where she worked as a police officer. In 1969 she married, and changed her last name to Mørdre-Lammedal. She took part in several Holmenkollen ski festivals, winning the 5 km race in 1974. In 1971 she became the first Norwegian woman to win the Holmenkollen medal (shared with Marjatta Kajosmaa and Reidar Hjermstad). Domestically she won 13 Norwegian titles, six over 5 km and seven over 10 km.

Cross-country skiing results
All results are sourced from the International Ski Federation (FIS).

Olympic Games
 3 medals – (1 gold, 1 silver, 1 bronze)

World Championships
 1 medal – (1 silver)

References

External links

 – click Holmenkollmedaljen for downloadable pdf file 
 – click Vinnere for downloadable pdf file 

1940 births
2016 deaths
Cross-country skiers at the 1968 Winter Olympics
Cross-country skiers at the 1972 Winter Olympics
Holmenkollen medalists
Holmenkollen Ski Festival winners
Norwegian female cross-country skiers
Olympic cross-country skiers of Norway
Olympic gold medalists for Norway
Olympic silver medalists for Norway
Olympic bronze medalists for Norway
Olympic medalists in cross-country skiing
FIS Nordic World Ski Championships medalists in cross-country skiing
Medalists at the 1972 Winter Olympics
Medalists at the 1968 Winter Olympics
People from Nes, Akershus
Sportspeople from Viken (county)